Al Chang (July 13, 1922 – September 30, 2007) was an American military photographer twice nominated for the Pulitzer Prize.

He was a dock worker in 1941 when he witnessed the Japanese attack on Pearl Harbor, and would later work as a military photographer for the U.S. Army, serving in World War II, and the Korean War and the Vietnam War. He briefly left the armed forces to work for National Geographic and the Associated Press during the Vietnam War, but then returned to work for the Army during the war.

Notes

External links
Al Chang, 85; Trained Lens On 3 Wars Washington Post, October 5, 2007.

1922 births
2007 deaths
Deaths from leukemia
20th-century American photographers
World War II photographers
United States Army personnel of World War II
United States Army personnel of the Korean War
United States Army personnel of the Vietnam War
Vietnam War photographers
War correspondents of the Korean War